The Enigma of Health: The Art of Healing in a Scientific Age is a 1993 book about the philosophy of medicine by Hans-Georg Gadamer, in which the author examines the key components of medical practice such as death, life, anxiety, freedom, health and the relationship between the body and the soul based on the phenomenological framework developed by Martin Heidegger in Being and Time.

References

1993 non-fiction books
1996 non-fiction books
Works by Hans-Georg Gadamer
Books about hermeneutics
Books about health
Philosophy of medicine
Polity (publisher) books